Events from 2013 in Switzerland.

Events
Public holidays in one or several cantons of Switzerland are marked (¹).

January
January 1 - New Year's Day¹
January 2 - Berchtoldstag¹

February

March
March 19 - Saint Joseph's Day 
March 29 - Good Friday
March 31 - Easter Day

April
April 1 - Easter Monday

May
May 1 - May Day
May 9 - Ascension Day 
May 19 - Pentecost 
May 20 - Whit Monday
May 30 - Corpus Christi

June

July

August
August 1 - Swiss National Day
August 15 - Assumption of Mary

September
September 16 - Swiss federal fast
September - By popular referendum approved by 66% of the voters, the canton of Ticino prohibited to hide the face in a public area. it become the first canton in Switzerland to ban it.

October

November
November 1 - All Saints' Day

December
December 8 - Feast of the Immaculate Conception
December 24 - Christmas Eve
December 25 - Christmas Day
December 26 - St. Stephen's Day
December 31 - New Year's Eve

Incumbents

Awards 
 :de:Feiertage in der Schweiz (Public holidays in Switzerland)

Deaths

References

 
2013 in Europe